Benjamin Compaoré (born 5 August 1987) is a French athlete specialising in the triple jump. He competed at the 2012 Summer Olympics and the 2016 Summer Olympics.

Compaoré won the gold medal at the 2014 European Championships and the bronze at the 2016 World Indoor Championships.

His personal bests in the event are 17.48 metres outdoors (-0.1 m/s, Marrakech 2014) and 17.14 metres indoors (Liévin 2012).

Personal life
Born in France, Compaoré was born to a Burkinabe father and French mother. He has a daughter with his fiance, the Spanish triple jumper Ana Peleteiro in 2022.

Achievements

References

External links
 
 
 
 
 
 

1987 births
Living people
French male triple jumpers
People from Bar-le-Duc
French sportspeople of Burkinabé descent
Sportspeople of Burkinabé descent
Athletes (track and field) at the 2012 Summer Olympics
Athletes (track and field) at the 2016 Summer Olympics
Athletes (track and field) at the 2020 Summer Olympics
Olympic athletes of France
World Athletics Championships athletes for France
European Athletics Championships medalists
Olympic male triple jumpers
Sportspeople from Meuse (department)
IAAF Continental Cup winners
French Athletics Championships winners
21st-century Burkinabé people